Jafarabad (also Romanized as Ja‘farābād) is a village in Beyza Rural District, Beyza District, Sepidan County, Fars Province, Iran. At the 2006 census, its population was 490, in 113 families.

References 

Populated places in Beyza County